Freezland Rock is a conspicuous sharp-pointed rock,  high, located  west of Bristol Island in the South Sandwich Islands. This feature was originally named "Freezland Peak" by Captain Cook, after Samuel Freezland, the seaman who first sighted it and so discovered the South Sandwich group in 1775. Cook's chart, showing the feature as an insular rock, was verified in 1930 by Discovery Investigations personnel on the Discovery II and the terminology has been altered accordingly.

Freezland Rock is the westernmost of a chain of rocks extending WSW from Turmoil Point, the westernmost point of Bristol Island. These are Grindle Rock, Wilson Rock and Freezland Rock.

References

Rock formations of South Georgia and the South Sandwich Islands